Stanley Caine (born Stanley Victor Micklewhite; October 1935 – 13 January 2013) was an English actor and the younger brother of actor Michael Caine. He was best known for his role as "Coco" in The Italian Job, a film released in 1969 also starring Michael Caine.

In addition to his older brother Michael, Stanley had an older maternal half-brother David whom Stan and Michael only knew of after their mother's death in 1989. Their half-brother died in 1992.

Caine was diagnosed with leukaemia in early 2008. He died in his sleep in January 2013 in Ruislip, West London.

Filmography

References

External links

1936 births
2013 deaths
20th-century English male actors
Male actors from London
English male film actors